Ryan Patrick O'Hearn (born July 26, 1993) is an American professional baseball first baseman in the Baltimore Orioles organization. He has played in Major League Baseball (MLB) for the Kansas City Royals.

Amateur career
O'Hearn graduated from Wakeland High School in Frisco, Texas. As a senior, he hit .505 with 15 home runs and 55 RBIs, earning a spot on Baseball America's second team High School All-American team. He was not drafted out of high school in the 2011 MLB draft and he enrolled and played college baseball at Sam Houston State University. In 2014, his junior season, he batted .292 with eight home runs and 44 RBIs in 62 games.

Professional career

Kansas City Royals
The Kansas City Royals selected O'Hearn in the eighth round of the 2014 Major League Baseball draft. He signed and spent 2014 with the Idaho Falls Chukars, posting a .361 batting average with 13 home runs and 54 RBIs in 64 games. O'Hearn started 2015 with the Lexington Legends, and after batting .277 with 19 home runs and 56 RBIs, was promoted to the Wilmington Blue Rocks where he finished the season, posting a .236 batting average with eight home runs and 21 RBIs. He spent 2016 with both Wilmington and the Northwest Arkansas Naturals, slashing a combined .275/.351/.478 with 22 home runs and 78 RBIs in 134 total games between both teams, and 2017 with the Omaha Storm Chasers and Northwest Arkansas, batting a combined .253 with 22 home runs and 64 RBIs in 133 total games.

O'Hearn was called up to the major leagues on July 31, 2018, and hit a home run in his first game. He ended the season with 12 home runs and 30 RBIs in 44 games. He struggled offensively in 2019, hitting only .195 with 14 home runs and 38 RBI.

On July 7, 2020, it was announced that O'Hearn had tested positive for COVID-19. Overall with the 2020 Kansas City Royals, O'Hearn batted .195 with two home runs and 18 RBIs in 42 games. In 2021, he batted .225/.268/.369 with 9 home runs and 29 RBIs in 84 games.

On December 28, 2022, the Royals designated O'Hearn for assignment.

Baltimore Orioles
On January 3, 2023, O'Hearn was traded to the Baltimore Orioles in exchange for cash considerations. On January 5, O’Hearn was designated for assignment by Baltimore following the waiver claim of Lewin Díaz. On January 12, O'Hearn was sent outright to the Triple-A Norfolk Tides.

References

External links

Sam Houston State Bearcats bio

1993 births
Living people
People from Frisco, Texas
Baseball players from Texas
Major League Baseball first basemen
Kansas City Royals players
Sam Houston Bearkats baseball players
Idaho Falls Chukars players
Lexington Legends players
Wilmington Blue Rocks players
Northwest Arkansas Naturals players
Surprise Saguaros players
Omaha Storm Chasers players